Chileans in the Falkland Islands are people of Chilean ancestry or nationality who live in the Falkland Islands. They form largest community coming from mainland South America and the largest non-British group on the islands, accounting for over 6% of the total population according to the 2012 census. However, the actual number of Chileans living in the Falkland Islands may be higher as some individuals of Chilean origin may have identified themselves as "Falkland Islander" in the census, and the census did not include temporary Chilean workers on the islands.

History
A Chilean consulate was established on the Falklands in the 1870s and remained well into the 20th century. The first Chileans to arrive on the Falklands in large numbers came in the late 1970s, mainly from Punta Arenas and other parts of the Magallanes Region, with 28 permanent Chilean residents listed in the 1980 census. Following the Falklands War in 1982, Argentine nationals were banned from visiting the Falklands until the 1990s, which led to many Chileans (whose government had supported the UK during the war) moving to the Falklands to take up jobs previously held by Argentines. The permanent Chilean population remained fairly stable until the start of the 21st century when Chileans remaining on the islands for longer than 6 years rose to over 100. According to the 2012 census, there were 161 Chilean residents (82 women and 79 men) in Stanley and Camp, representing 6% of the civilian population, with an addition 20 Chileans listed as working at RAF Mount Pleasant, bringing the total number to 181 (6.2% of the total population).

The 2006 census indicated that about 157 Islanders had Chilean ancestry, nine were British Chilean, ten were of Falkland Islands-Chilean ancestry, there was one of Brazilian Chilean ancestry and another was Spanish Chilean.

Population
The population speaks Chilean Spanish and Falkland Islands English, and they sometimes speak Spanglish, and are prominently Roman Catholic. Most reside in Stanley, with a small number living in Camp and RAF Mount Pleasant. The influence of the Chileans can be felt in the local food with some bars serving typical Chilean cuisine and the islands receive most Chilean TV channels. Chilean Independence Day is also celebrated on the Falklands and since 2010 festivities have taken place with the Governor at Government House.

The main link between the Falklands and Chile is the weekly LATAM Airlines between RAF Mount Pleasant, Punta Arenas and Santiago de Chile. The flights have been stopped for periods, most notably in 1999 when the Chilean Government banned the flight in protest to the UK's indictment and arrest of Augusto Pinochet. The weekly flight is also the only link between the islands and mainland South America and has become increasingly important since 2011 when the members of Mercosur banned Falklands flagged vessels from entering their ports in support of Argentine's claim to the islands. In 2011 Argentine President Cristina Fernandez de Kirchner threatened to ban flights to the Falklands from flying over Argentine airspace, which led to protests by Chileans in the islands and Chile itself against Kirchner's proposals.

Chileans who have lived on the islands for more than seven years are entitled to apply for Falkland Islands status, considered to be the closest thing to citizenship that the Falkland Islands can grant, giving them full residency rights - although in order to vote they need to hold British, Irish or Commonwealth citizenship. Although the current Chilean government supports Argentine's sovereignty claim to the Falklands, the majority of the Chilean population on the islands and Mainland Chile support the Falkland Islanders' right to self-determination and in 2017 the Chilean-born Leona Vidal Roberts was elected to the Falkland Islands Legislative Assembly.

See also

 Chileans in the United Kingdom
 Demographics of the Falkland Islands

Notes

References

Falkland Islands

Society of the Falkland Islands
Immigrants to the Falkland Islands
Latin American diaspora in the United Kingdom